Jeff Grisamore (born November 16, 1961) is an American politician who served in the Missouri House of Representatives from 2007 to 2015.

References

1961 births
Living people
Republican Party members of the Missouri House of Representatives